The Trillium Book Award ( or Prix Trillium) is an annual literary award presented to writers in Ontario, Canada. It is administered by Ontario Creates, a Crown agency of the Government of Ontario, which is overseen by the Ministry of Heritage, Sport, Tourism and Culture Industries. The monetary component for the award includes amounts paid to the author of the book and to the publisher of the book. The award has been expanded several times since its establishment in 1987: a separate award for French-language literature was added in 1994, an award for poetry in each language was added in 2003, and an award for French-language children's literature was added in 2006.

History

The Trillium Book Award was created for three reasons:  
to recognize a book of literary excellence which furthers the understanding of Ontarians and Ontario society; 
to assist Ontario’s publishing industry; and, 
to bring Ontario’s public library and writing communities closer together.

The Trillium Award was one of several creative initiatives undertaken by the Libraries and Community Information Branch while under the direction of Wil Vanderelst during the 1980s, that encouraged the development of Ontario writers and the distribution of their works. When created in 1987 the Trillium Book Award/Prix Trillium was the richest book award in Canada with a cash prize of $10,000 to the winner. It was also unique in that a separate $2000 would go to the publisher of the winning book to assist in its marketing and promotion. Under the auspices of the Libraries Branch, both the shortlisted books and the finalist were marketed through a unique logo for the prize, posters, bookmarks as well as an aggressive six-week media campaign targeting both bookstores as well as public libraries. (The prize today is $20,000 for the writer with $2,500 for the publisher, and $10,000/$2000 for the poetry prize.)

The first jury was bilingual and selected seven nominees for the book award. Books in both languages were considered, as were poetry, fiction, and non-fiction books. The members of the first jury were Joyce Marshall, novelist and translator; Pierre Levesque, an Ottawa bookseller and specialist in French Canadian books; Grace Buller, retired librarian and former editor of Ontario Library Review (of Books); William Eccles, historian and Professor Emeritus; and Wayne Grady, anthologist, critic, translator, and former editor of Harrowsmith.

The Trillium Book Award met with considerable approval from newspaper book editors at the time of the first award in 1988.  While some critics did not like a judged competition involving personal taste in reading the material, the benefits of the award in assisting the marketing of Canadian books was thought more important.  The Writers’ Union led at that time by the writer Matt Cohen met with Wil Vanderelst and strongly supported both programs given cutbacks in support for arts organizations at the federal level.  Through reprioritizing, the public libraries budget these programs continued – although the writers in libraries program was eventually eliminated as part of the province’s budgetary restrictions.  The Trillium Book Award managed to avoid the budgetary ax only through the personal support of the then Premier, Bob Rae. He is the only Premier of Ontario who has attended the presentation program of the award.

Awards and eligibility

The Trillium Award is open to books in any genre: fiction, non-fiction, drama, children's books, and poetry. Anthologies, new editions, re-issues and translations are not eligible. Electronic and self-published books are also ineligible. Three jury members per language judge the submissions, select the shortlist and the winning title. The jury is composed of writers and other members of the literary community.

Canadian citizens and landed immigrants who have lived in Ontario for at least three out of the past five years and who have been published anywhere in the world are eligible. Their publishers are invited to submit titles to the Ministry of Culture for consideration. In 1993 the award was expanded by Premier Bob Rae's government to also include a French-language category; it was first awarded in 1994.

In 2003, new English and French poetry categories were added to the awards. The following year, however, due to the smaller number of French-language titles published in Ontario there were not enough French poetry submissions to present an award; accordingly, the French section is now divided into poetry and children's literature awards presented in alternating years, with each award having an eligibility period of two years rather than one. The English poetry award continues to be presented yearly, and an English children's literature award is not presented; however, English children's books are eligible to be nominated for the English fiction award.

Winners and nominees
From 1987 to 1993, when only a single award was presented irrespective of language or literary genre, winners and nominees are directly listed below. From 1994 on, please see Trillium Book Award, English and Trillium Book Award, French.

References

External links

Ontario awards
Awards established in 1987
1987 establishments in Ontario
Canadian children's literary awards
Canadian poetry awards
Canadian fiction awards
Canadian non-fiction literary awards